The Pabst Blue Ribbon 2004 Chinese FA Cup (Chinese: 2004蓝带中国足球协会杯) was the 10th edition of Chinese FA Cup. The matches of first round were kicked off on 10 April 2004, and the final took place at Helong Stadium on 18 December 2004.

The cup title sponsor was China Pabst Blue Ribbon.

Results

First round

Second round

First leg

 Shenzhen Kejian abdicated to play at their home stadium.

Second leg

 The Penalty shoot-out was supposed to end at the fourth round, however, Lu Jun, referee of the match, insisted both teams to kick one addition round.

Third round

First leg

Second leg

Semi-finals

First leg

Second leg

Final

See also
2004 Chinese Super League Cup

References

2004
2004 in Chinese football
2004 domestic association football cups